Pristimantis briceni is a species of frog in the family Strabomantidae.
It is endemic to Venezuela.
Its natural habitats are tropical moist lowland forests, moist montane forests, and high-altitude grassland.

References

briceni
Endemic fauna of Venezuela
Amphibians of Venezuela
Amphibians of the Andes
Amphibians described in 1903
Taxonomy articles created by Polbot